Ličenca is a settlement in the Municipality of Slovenske Konjice in eastern Slovenia. It lies in the hills north of Loče on the road to Levič and Žabljek. The area is part of the traditional Styria region and is included in the Savinja Statistical Region.

References

External links
Ličenca at Geopedia

Populated places in the Municipality of Slovenske Konjice